Cherré is the site of the archeological excavation of a Gallo-Roman complex of 20 hectares from the 1st to the 3rd centuries. It is situated in the town Aubigné-Racan, in the Sarthe département of western France, in the région Pays de la Loire.

The site was likely a rural center of commercial and religious activity before the Roman conquest. Excavations in 1977 by C. Lambert and J. Rioufreyt discovered an ancient theatre, two temples, Roman thermae, a forum and an aqueduct.

Roman towns and cities in France
Former populated places in France
Cenomani